North Carolina wine refers to wine made from grapes grown in the U.S. state of North Carolina.  Wine has been produced in the area since the early days of European colonization in the 17th century.  Wine growers in North Carolina were the first to cultivate a Native American grape variety, the Scuppernong, which produces a sweet wine, examples of which are still being made in the state.  Most wine produced in North Carolina since the year 2000 is made from Vitis vinifera grape varieties, although French hybrid and Vitis labrusca varieties remain common.

History of wineries in North Carolina 

In the mid-19th Century, there were some 25 wineries in North Carolina, with extensive independent vineyards, to such an extent that North Carolina dominated the national market for American wines at the time. The Scuppernong grape was the primary source for North Carolina's 19th Century wine, as it had been for about two centuries. The Civil War ended that market dominance, through damage to the industry by loss of manpower and scarce capital, as well as through revocation of winemaking licenses due to regulatory retribution following the war. Wine production began to recover in the decades after the war through the early 20th Century. However, North Carolina voted to become a dry state in 1908 and that decision, coupled with the onset of Prohibition, ended winemaking in North Carolina. Repeal in 1933, followed by the passage by North Carolina's legislature in 1935 of laws permitting winemaking, began a rebirth, but it was several decades after World War II before North Carolina's wine industry would show significant growth.

Modern wine industry

North Carolina ranks tenth in both grape and wine production in the United States. The state's wine industry continues to expand, and today is one of the United States’ five most visited state destinations for wine and culinary tourism. As a point of reference, there are not many state destinations for wine tourism in the United States, so five is almost last on the list.  In 2007, North Carolina contained 55 wineries and 350 vineyards. By 2011, this had grown to more than 100 wineries and more than 400 vineyards.

See also
Muscadine

References

 
Wine regions of the United States by state